Farahad Zama is a British IT director and novelist. He was born in Visakhapatnam (Vizag) on the Eastern coast of India in 1966. After studying in Kharagpur he moved to Mumbai to work for an investment bank. His career took him to New York, Zurich and Luxembourg and London. He lives in South London with his wife and two sons.

Education
He gained a master's degree in Electrical Engineering from the Indian Institute of Technology at Kharagpur, near Kolkata.

Critical acclaim 
His first novel The Marriage Bureau for Rich People won the Melissa Nathan Award for Comedy Romance It was also Richard and Judy book of the month. It was short listed for Best Published Fiction at the Muslim Writers Awards, and he was shortlisted for Best New Writer of the Year at the British Book Awards.

Books
 The Marriage Bureau for Rich People, Abacus (2 October 2008)
 The Many Conditions of Love, Abacus (1 July 2010)
 The Wedding Wallah, Abacus (28 April 2011)
 Mrs Ali's Road to Happiness, Abacus (3 May 2012)

References

External links
 farahadzama.com
 Farahad Zama on Goodreads
 Farahad Zama on Janklow & Nesbit

1966 births
Living people
Writers from Visakhapatnam
British male writers
British writers of Indian descent
IIT Kharagpur alumni
Indian emigrants to the United Kingdom